Dongcheng District ("East City District") may refer to two districts of the People's Republic of China:

Dongcheng District, Beijing
Dongcheng Subdistrict, Dongguan, Guangdong

See also
 Dongchang (disambiguation)